Chebenki may refer to:
Chebenki (air base), an air base in Orenburg Oblast, Russia
Chebenki (rural locality), a settlement in Orenburg Oblast, Russia